Tylenchulidae is a family of nematodes belonging to the order Tylenchida.

Genera

Genera:
 Boomerangia Siddiqi, 1994
 Cacopaurus Thorne, 1943
 Gracilacus

References

Nematodes